Mount Kazbek or Mount Kazbegi   is a dormant stratovolcano and one of the major mountains of the Caucasus, located on the Russian-Georgian border - in Russia's North Ossetia region and  Georgia's Kazbegi District.

At 5,034 m (16,515 ft) high, it is one of the highest peaks in Russia and the third-highest peak in Georgia (after Mount Shkhara and Janga). Kazbegi is also the second-highest volcanic summit in the Caucasus, after Mount Elbrus. The summit lies directly to the west of the town of Stepantsminda and is the most prominent geographic feature of the area.

Origin of the name 
The name Kazbeg is disputed; some claims are it is named after a Circassian nobleman who lived on it, other claims are it is named after local nobleman Dimitri Chopikashvili (grand father of the Georgian writer Aleksandre Kazbegi) got the title of "Kazgeb" from Georgian king Erekle II. The word "Kazbek" means a "nobleman" in Kabardian language. The title appeared under Georgian king Rostom in the 17th century. The name of the mountain in Georgian, Mqinvartsveri, translates to "Glacier Peak" or "Freezing Cold Peak". The Vainakh name Bashlam translates as "Molten Mount".

Location
Kazbek is located on the Khokh Range, a mountain range which runs north of the Greater Caucasus Range, and which is pierced by the gorges of the Ardon and the Terek. At its eastern foot runs the Georgian Military Road through the pass of Darial 2,378 meters (7,805 feet). The mountain itself lies along the edge of the Borjomi–Kazbegi Fault (which is a northern sub-ending of the North Anatolian Fault). The region is highly active tectonically, with numerous small earthquakes occurring at regular intervals. An active geothermal/hot spring system also surrounds the mountain. Kazbek is a potentially active volcano, built up of trachyte and sheathed with lava, and has the shape of a double cone, whose base lies at an altitude of 1,770 meters (5,800 feet). Kazbek is the highest of the volcanic cones of the Kazbegi volcanic group which also includes Mount Khabarjina (3,142 metres).

Owing to the steepness of its slopes, the glaciers of Kazbek are not very large. The total combined area of all of Kazbek's glaciers is 135 km2. The best-known glacier is the Dyevdorak (Devdaraki), which creeps down the north-eastern slope into a gorge of the same name, reaching a level of 2,295 meters (7,530 feet). Kazbegi's other glaciers include the Mna, Denkara, Gergeti, Abano, and Chata.  The recent collapse of the Kolka Glacier, located in a valley between Mt. Jimara and Kazbegi in the year 2002 was attributed to solfatara volcanic activity along the northern slope of the mountain, although there was no eruption. In addition to the 2002 event, a massive collapse of the Devdaraki Glacier on the mountain's northeastern slope which occurred on August 20, 2014, led to the death of seven people. The glacier collapse dammed the Terek River in the Daryal Gorge and flooded the Georgian Military Highway.

From 24 to 28 May 2019 Caucasus Skitouring Network organized an expedition to survey Mt. Kazbegi's height. On 27 May 2019 at 12:22 GMT+4, for the first time, a survey team placed a GPS receiver on the Mt. Kazbegi peak. The new height is defined with the WGS 84 datum. Height was determinate with 5mm accuracy. Defined height is 5053.927m.

Legend
Mount Kazbegi is associated in Georgian folklore with Amirani, the Georgian version of Prometheus, who was chained on the mountain in punishment for having stolen fire from the gods and giving it to mortals. The location of his imprisonment later became the site of an Orthodox hermitage located in a cave called "Betlemi" (Bethlehem) at approximately the 4,000-meter level. According to legends, this cave housed many sacred relics, including Abraham's tent and the manger of the infant Jesus.

The summit was first climbed in 1868 by D. W. Freshfield, A. W. Moore, and C. Tucker of the Alpine Club, with the guide François Devouassoud. They were followed by female Russian alpinist Maria Preobrazhenskaya, who made the climb nine times starting in 1900.

Kazbegi nature reserve
The area around Mount Kazbegi was designated a nature reserve by the Soviet government in 1979, and includes beech forests, subalpine forests and alpine meadows. Many of the plants and animals in the reserve are endemic to the Caucasus region.

Climate

See also
 List of highest points of Russian federal subjects
 List of volcanoes in Georgia (country)

Gallery

References

External links

  – photos
 Normal climbing route to Mount Kazbek – detailed description
  Different ways to climb mt Kazbek – detailed description

Stratovolcanoes of Russia
Mountains of Georgia (country)
Mountains of North Ossetia–Alania
Volcanoes of Georgia (country)
Potentially active volcanoes
Georgia (country)–Russia border
International mountains of Europe
Geography of Mtskheta-Mtianeti
Five-thousanders of the Caucasus
Holocene stratovolcanoes